The 1986 Kent State Golden Flashes football team was an American football team that represented Kent State University in the Mid-American Conference (MAC) during the 1986 NCAA Division I-A football season. In their first season under head coach Glen Mason, the Golden Flashes compiled a 5–6 record (5–3 against MAC opponents), finished in a tie for second place in the MAC, and were outscored by all opponents by a combined total of 288 to 179.

The team's statistical leaders included Patrick Young with 779 rushing yards and 756 passing yards, and Eric Dye with 425 receiving yards.  Defensive back Stuart Sims was selected as a first-team All-MAC player.

Schedule

References

Kent State
Kent State Golden Flashes football seasons
Kent State Golden Flashes football